Route 79 is a  state highway in southeastern Massachusetts. The route begins as a highway in Fall River also known as the Fall River Viaduct and Western Fall River Expressway before becoming a more rural route.

Route description

Route 79 begins south of the Braga Bridge and I-195, multiplexed with Route 138 as a surface four-lane controlled-access highway. It has exits to Davol Street, which act as one-way frontage roads on both sides of Route 79, and to the Veterans Memorial Bridge, at which point Route 138 leaves Route 79 and goes over the bridge.

The route continues northward, passing under North Main Street with exit access to that street.  It then connects to Route 24 at that route's exit 7.  There is no access between Route 79 north and Route 24 south, or vice versa.  The route continues concurrently along Route 24 into the Assonet section of the town of Freetown, where it leaves its concurrency at exit 11 (formerly 9), turning on to South Main Street.  (South Main Street southbound in Assonet connects to North Main Street in Fall River.)  The route passes through the village before turning eastward along Elm Street, intertwining with the Assonet River as both make their way into Berkley.

In Berkley, Route 79 passes through the village of Myricks, in the far eastern end of the town. It crosses the New Bedford Secondary in Myricks, and Route 140 just over the Taunton line. In Taunton, the route follows along the Taunton-Lakeville town line before leaving Taunton completely.  In Lakeville, the route heads through the northern part of the town, crossing Route 18 and passing the former Lakeville Hospital, before ending at a 4-way intersection with Route 105 and Commercial Drive (the entry to Middleborough/Lakeville station).

History

In 2012, the northern terminus of Route 79 was relocated. Before the project, the northern terminus of Route 79 still ended at Route 105, only 1/10 of a mile north of its current terminus, but it was too close to the southbound ramps for Interstate 495. By relocating Route 79 to a four-way intersection with Route 105 and Commercial Drive, traffic was eased during rush hour. Instead of Route 79 traffic looping onto Route 105 to get to the MBTA station, the new alignment provides easier access to the MBTA station from areas such as North Lakeville, East Taunton, Berkley and Freetown.

The southern end of Route 79 used to be a double-decked elevated highway called the Fall River Viaduct, with ramps to Route 138 and I-195. The viaduct continued northward under the Braga Bridge for a third of a mile before splitting into a surface four-lane highway. As part of a $3 billion effort to replace structurally deficient bridges in Massachusetts, the Massachusetts Department of Transportation replaced the Fall River Viaduct and some of its connector ramps to I-195 with new roadways and structures. The project was completed in 2016.

The expressway closed permanently on February 27, 2023 to be replaced by a street level urban boulevard.

Major intersections
All interchanges south of Route 24 are unnumbered.

References

External links
 Route 79/Braga Bridge Improvements Project

079
Transportation in Bristol County, Massachusetts
Transportation in Plymouth County, Massachusetts